Christian Montcouquiol ("Nimeño II") (born in Speyer, Germany, March 10, 1954, died in Caveirac, France, November 25, 1991) was a French matador.

Biography 

Christian Montcouquiol was the brother of Alain Montcouquiol, a bullfighter known as "Nimeño I".  From 1975 to 1982, Christian appeared in arenas in Spain, France, and Latin America under the direction of Spanish promoter Manolo Chopera.  In 1982, Christian separated from Chopera and turned to his brother Alain for management.

On May 14, 1989 in Nîmes, Nimeño II and Portuguese torero Victor Mendes were scheduled to fight six bulls.  Mendes was injured early in the match, and Nimeño II won renown for defeating all six bulls single-handedly.

Death

On September 10, 1989 in Arles, Nimeño II was hurled into the air by a bull named Pañolero.  He landed on his head, fracturing his cervical vertebrae and suffering paraplegia.  After months of rehabilitation, Nimeño regained the use of his legs and right arm, but his left arm remained paralyzed.  On November 25, 1991, Nimeño II committed suicide by hanging himself in his garage.

Honors 
The bullfighting arenas of Eauze and Caveirac are named for Nimeño II.  There are commemorative plaques to Nimeño II in the arenas of Arles, Mont-de-Marsan, and Béziers in France, and Aguascalientes in Mexico.  At the arena in Nîmes, a statue of Nimeño II (above) was erected, and the annual "Trophy Nimeño II" is awarded there to the leading novillero without picadors.  The street in front of the Béziers arena is named "Plaza Nimeño II".

Career highlights 
 Public debut, March 30, 1967, in Tarascon, France

 First novillada without picadors, July 19, 1969, Saint-Gilles (France), novillos from André Pourquier
 First novillada with picadors, May 28, 1972, Lunel (France) -- and first resounding success, the beginning of his public career, after which he never appeared without picadors.
 May 17, 1975 in Nìmes (France), novillos from Matías Bernardos.
 First appearance in Spain, August 17, 1975, in Santiestéban (Jaén) -- novillos from Germán Gervás.
 Alternativa in Nìmes, May 28, 1977—padrino, Angel Teruel; testigo, Manzaneres—bulls from Torestrella.
 First appearance as a matador in Spain, May 30, 1977, in Barcelona—bulls from Matías Bernardos.

 Confirmed his alternativa in Mexico, January 28, 1979, padrino, Manolo Martines, testigo, Dámaso González—bulls from Tequisquiapan.
 Confirmed his alternativa in Madrid, May 21, 1979, padrino, Rafael de Paula; testigo, Angel Teruel—bulls from Luis Algarra

References 

Alain Montcouquiol, Recouvre-le de lumière (1998),  (French)

External links 
  Toros magazine profile, Sept. 1999 (French)
  Portaltaurino.com profile (Spanish)

1954 births
1991 suicides
French bullfighters
Suicides by hanging in France